The Municipal President of Pabellón de Arteaga (or Mayor of Pabellón de Arteaga in the colloquial sense), is the head of the City Council of Pabellón de Arteaga, the title was created on May 1, 1965 when the Congress of Aguascalientes elevated it to municipality rank, separating it from the Rincón de Romos, the first holder of municipal president was Manuel Ambriz Pacheco as interim president in 1965.

List of titulars 

List of all municipal presidents since 1965

References 

Lists of municipal presidents in Mexico
Politicians from Aguascalientes